Old Towers and Columns Istanbul.

Old Towers
 Galata Tower
 Maiden's Tower
 Beyazit Tower
 Tower of Justice

Old Columns
 Egyptian Obelisk
 Stone Obelisk
 Serpentine Column
 Goths Column
 Çemberlitas Column
 Marcianus Column
 Arcadios Column
 Theodosius Triumphal Arch
 Million Stone

Clock Towers
 Dolmabahçe Clock Tower
 Etfal Hospital Clock Tower
 Yildiz Clock Tower
 Nusretiye Clock Tower